Awesome Inc, also known as We Are: Awesome Incorporated, is an American animation and motion design studio founded in 2006 by Ashley Kohler and Drew Tyndell. Located in Atlanta, Georgia, Awesome Inc does both commercial and series production. Its clients include FX Networks, Adult Swim, Cartoon Network, Nickelodeon, Nick@Nite, Wieden+Kennedy, Warner Bros. Discovery, and Marvel. 

The studio's series productions include Adult Swim's Aqua Teen Hunger Force, Squidbillies, Your Pretty Face is Going to Hell, and Birdgirl.  As of 2021, Awesome Inc has commenced work on two projects for Paramount Global: a reboot of Ren & Stimpy, and a spinoff of MTV’s Daria, entitled Jodie.

History
Launched in 2006, Awesome Inc began as a motion design studio, primarily focused on the creation of promos, commercials, and network packaging. In 2011, Awesome Inc became the studio of record to animate and composite Adult Swim's satire-comedy Squidbillies, which continued to run for another 10 seasons before concluding in November 2021. Awesome Inc also animated and composited 3 seasons of Adult Swim's Aqua Teen Hunger Force.

Upon the departure of Drew Tyndell as Creative Director and co-owner in 2013, Awesome Inc became a certified woman-owned business led by Ashley Kohler as President / CEO. In February 2021, Awesome Inc was tapped by ViacomCBS to produce its first animated feature film Jodie.

Productions

Commercial/Packaging Work

References

External links 
 Official website

American animation studios
Mass media companies established in 2006
Companies based in Atlanta
Adult animation studios
American companies established in 2006